The following is a list of notable events and releases of the year 1952 in Norwegian music.

Events

Deaths

 April
 21 – Alfred Andersen-Wingar, composer and orchestra conductor (born 1869).

 December
 14 – Fartein Valen, composer and musical theorist (born 1887).

Births

 February
 20 – Halvor Haug, composer.
 22 – Soon-Mi Chung, violinist, viola player, and musical director.

 April
 9 – Magnar Åm, composer
 25 – Ketil Bjørnstad, pianist, composer and author

 May
 3 – Henning Sommerro, pianist, composer, and professor at NTNU.

 June
 6 – Kjell Samkopf, drummer and composer.
 12 – Bent Patey, guitarist, composer and writer.
 14 – Trond-Viggo Torgersen, physician, broadcaster, television host, comedian, singer, and songwriter.
 19 – Sidsel Endresen, jazz vocalist, composer and actor.
 25 – Radka Toneff, jazz singer (died 1982).

 August
 11 – Finn Sletten, jazz drummer

 September
 9 Per Jørgensen, jazz trumpeter

 October
 3 Øyvind Rauset, artist, musician and composer.

 November
 8 – Carl Haakon Waadeland, musicologist and drummer
 28 – Ole Thomsen, jazz guitarist

 December
 16 – Jon Laukvik, organist

See also
 1952 in Norway
 Music of Norway

References

 
Norwegian music
Norwegian
Music
1950s in Norwegian music